Burial Ground is the ninth studio album by Swedish death metal band Grave. It was released on June 14, 2010, through Regain Records.

Track listing

Personnel
Grave
Ola Lindgren - Vocals, Guitars
Ronnie Bergerståhl - Drums
Fredrik Isaksson - Bass

Guest musician
Karl Sanders - Lead guitars on "Bloodtrail"

Production
Costin Chioreanu - Artwork, Layout, Design
Ola Lindgren - Producer, Recording, Mixing, Mastering, Lyrics
Ronnie Bergerståhl - Producer, Recording, Mixing, Mastering
Matti Kärki - Additional lyrics on "Dismembered Mind"

References

2010 albums
Grave (band) albums
Regain Records albums